The following is an episode list for the anime television series Captain Tsubasa. Of the five series:
1983 TV series had 128 episodes and 4 films (Europe Daikessen & Ayaushi, Zen Nippon Jr., in '85; Asu ni Mukatte Hashire & Sekai Daikessen, Jr. World Cup in '86)
1989 OVA series (Shin) had 13 episodes and 1 other OVA (Holland Youth)
1994 TV series (J) had 47 episodes
2001 TV series (road to 2002) had 52 episodes
2018 TV series had 52 episodes

In total there have been 4 films, 14 OVAs and 279 TV episodes.

Captain Tsubasa

Season 1: 1983-84 (1-26)

Season 2: 1984 (1-26)

Season 3: 1984-85 (1-26)

Season 4: 1985 (1-26)

Season 5: 1985-86 (1-24)

Anime films

Shin Captain Tsubasa

Captain Tsubasa J (aka) World Youth

Captain Tsubasa: Road to 2002

Captain Tsubasa (2018)

Elementary School Arc - Shōgakusei-Hen

Middle School Arc - Chūgakusei-Hen

References

Captain Tsubasa
Captain Tsubasa